Sahoshi Manush Chai is a 2003 Bangladeshi film starring Shakib Khan and Keya opposite him. Actor Sohel Rana and Rajib garnered Bangladesh National Film Award for Best Supporting Actor.

Cast 
 Shakib Khan
 Keya
 Sohel Rana
 Shahnoor
 Misha Sawdagor
 Sadek Bachchu
 Rajib
 Rehana Jolly
 Khaleda Aktar Kalpona
 Nasir Khan
 Siraj Haider
 Zamilur Rahman Shakha
 Atikur Rahman Talukder
 Danny Raj
 Afzal Sharif
 Jacky Alamgir
 Babul Ahmed
 Sonia
 Nazma

Production

Soundtrack

Awards 
Bangladesh National Film Awards
Best Supporting Actor - Sohel Rana and Rajib
Best Female Playback Singer - Baby Nazneen

References

External links

2003 films
Bengali-language Bangladeshi films
Films scored by Alauddin Ali
2000s Bengali-language films